Brigadier Martin Melvin Cruickshank CIE FRSE FRCSE FACS FICS (1888-1964) was a Scottish surgeon, specialising in ophthalmic surgery. During the Second World War he was Chief Medical Officer for Delhi Province. He was created Commander of the Indian Empire in 1942.

Life

He was born in North Leith, the harbour area of Edinburgh on 22 March 1888, the son of George Hunter Cruickshank a marine engineer. He was a twin brother of Ernest Cruickshank. The family moved to Aberdeen around 1895 and he attended Robert Gordon's College with his twin. They then jointly studied Medicine at Aberdeen University. He graduated BSc in 1911 (a year after his brother).

In the First World War he joined the Royal Army Medical Corps, again with his twin, but they quickly were separated by events. He saw service in various fields of action: France, Belgium, Macedonia,  Serbia, Egypt and Bulgaria. He rose to the rank of captain in this period.

After the war he remained in the army and joined the Indian Medical Service. From 1921 to 1931 he acted as the Ophthalmic Specialist for the Northern and Western commands in India. After a period serving with the Madras Presidency, in 1934 he joined Madras Medical College as Professor of Surgery. In 1940 he was appointed Chief Medical Officer for the entire Delhi Province. Due to the Second World War he was promoted to Brigadier/ Consultant Surgeon to the Southern Army in India.

He was elected a Fellow of the Royal Society of Edinburgh in 1938. His proposers were his twin Ernest (who was elected in 1929), Leybourne Davidson, Sir John Carroll, and James R Matthews.

In January 1942 (in the New Year’s Honours List) he was created a Commander of the Indian Empire for his services in India.
In 1946 he returned to Aberdeen and spent his final 12 working years as Deputy Superintendent of Aberdeen Royal Infirmary. He retired aged 70.

He died at 62 Queens Road in Aberdeen on 10 October 1964. His twin brother Ernest died a few weeks later.

Family

He married Florence Watson in 1927.

References

1888 births
1964 deaths
People educated at Robert Gordon's College
Fellows of the Royal Society of Edinburgh
Alumni of the University of Aberdeen
People associated with Aberdeen
Scottish twins